Potato Star 2013QR3 is a South Korean television sitcom. It aired on tvN from September 23, 2013 to May 15, 2014 on Mondays to Thursdays at 20:50 for 120 episodes.

Plot
A mysterious asteroid nearly crash-lands on Earth in 2013 and causes strange things to happen, specifically to the Noh family and their neighbors. The show begins with Na Jin Ah and her mother Gil Sun-Ja living in a shabby house on the outskirts of Seoul. Jin-Ah dreams of pursuing a career in Kong Kong, a toy company, which her late father contributed to, but due to a lack of a college degree and experience, her application is rejected from the screening process. Meanwhile, the eldest son of the Noh family, Noh Min-Hyuk, prepares to inherit the role of CEO in Kong Kong. Also, the current CEO and head of the Noh family, Noh Soo-Dong is preparing to leave the company due to bladder sensitivity issues.  Other members of the Noh family include; the father of Soo-Dong, Noh Song, his wife Wang Yoo-Jung, their two daughters, Noh Bo-Young and Noh Soo-Young, and their pet dog, Cheol-Min.

Cast

The Noh family
Lee Soon-jae as Noh Song 
Roh Joo-hyun as Noh Soo-dong 
Geum Bo-ra as Wang Yoo-jung 
Go Kyung-pyo as Noh Min-hyuk
Seo Yea-ji as Noh Soo-young
Choi Song-hyun as Noh Bo-young
Kim Jung-min as Kim Do-sang mama
Kim Dan-yul as Kim Kyu-young 
Jung Joon-won as Kim Kyu-ho

Their neighbors
Ha Yeon-soo as Na Jin-ah
Oh Young-shil as Gil Seon-ja
Kang Nam-gil as Na Se-dol
Yeo Jin-goo as Hong Hye-sung / Noh Jun-hyuk
Chang Kiha as Jang Yul 
Kim Kwang-kyu as Director Oh 
Julien Kang as Julien 
Mina Fujii as Mina Fujii
Park Eun-ji as Kim Ji-hyun
Yoon Seo-hyun as Yoon Seo-hyun
Kim Sung-eun as Kim Sung-eun
Kim Sung-min  as Kim Ui-chan
Jung Hye-sung as Park Seung-hee
Park Hwi-soon as Park Hwi-soon
Na Seung-ho as Min-hyuk's friend
Yang Joo-ho as office manager of law firm

Cameos and guest appearances

Hwang Jung-eum as Soo-dong's secretary (ep 1)
Yoo In-na as jogging woman, Do-sang's dream girl (ep 4, 6)
Park Jung-soo as Mi-sook (ep 7)
Yoon Kye-sang as brain surgeon Kye-sang (ep 9-10)
Park Kyung-lim as Bo-young's husky voice (ep 10)
So Yoo-jin as suspicious housekeeper (ep 11)
Sunwoo Yong-nyeo as Noh Song's younger sister (ep 14)
Lee Jong-suk as Jong-suk (ep 15)
Jung Woong-in as dog's voice (ep 15)
Jung Yoo-geun as a kid on the bus with Julian (ep 17)
Lee Kwang-soo as movie director, Bo-young's first love (ep 18)
Park Ha-sun as president of Jang Yul's fan club (ep 30)
Kiha & The Faces (ep 30)
Seo Ji-seok as basketball teammate of young Noh Song (ep 38)
Yoo Jung-hyun as interview program host (ep 38)
 Choi Woong as Lee Ji-hun, Noh Soo-young's blind date (Ep. 40)
Yoon Ki-won as martial arts studio master (ep 47)
Jeong Jun-ha as Wang Jun-ha (ep 55)
Na Yeong-seok as police officer (ep 66)
Choi Eun-kyeong as Do-sang's cousin (ep 68)
Jang Hang-jun as professor (ep 69)
Im Sung-min as professor's wife (ep 69)
Seo Shin-ae as Seo Shin-ae (ep 79)
Choi Hong-man as Choi Hong-man (ep 79)
Krystal Jung as Jung Soo-jung (ep 81)
Ahn Nae-sang as photographer (ep 87)
Gong Seo-young as Gong Seo-young (ep 95, 98-99)
Kim Hye-seong as delivery boy (ep 100)
Noh Hyung-ok as AWOL soldier (ep 100)
Oh Seung-eun as Min Ji-yeon's mother (ep 103)
Jang Jung-hee as Yoo-jung's high school schoolmate (ep 109)
Yoon Gun as Soo-young's friend (ep 111)
Yoon Yoo-sun as bakeshop owner (ep 112)
Lee Juck as ex-boyfriend of young Seon-ja (ep 114)

Original soundtrack

Part 1

Part 2

Part 3

References

External links
 

2013 South Korean television series debuts
2014 South Korean television series endings
TVN (South Korean TV channel) television dramas
South Korean romance television series
South Korean comedy television series
Television series by Chorokbaem Media